Phyllocnistis puyehuensis is a moth of the family Gracillariidae, known from Chile. It was named by D.R. Davis in 1994.

References

Phyllocnistis
Endemic fauna of Chile
Moths of South America